

This is a timeline of English history, comprising important legal and territorial changes and political events in England and its predecessor states.  To read about the background to these events, see History of England.

 Prehistory: Mesolithic/Neolithic periodsBronze/Iron AgesCenturies: 1st2nd3rd4th5th6th7th8th9th10th11th12th13th14th15th16th17th18th19th20th21stReferencesSources

1st century BC 

 Centuries in 1st millennium: 1st2nd3rd4th5th6th7th8th9th10th

1st century

2nd century

3rd century

4th century

5th century

6th century

7th century

8th century

9th century

10th century

11th century

12th century

13th century

14th century

15th century

16th century

17th century

18th century

19th century

20th century

21st century

See also 

City and town timelines
 Timeline of Bath
Timeline of Barrow-in-Furness
Timeline of Birmingham
 Timeline of Bradford
 Timeline of Bristol
 Timeline of Cambridge
Timeline of Cheshire
 Timeline of Derby
 Timeline of Exeter
 Timeline of Hull
 Timeline of Leicester
Timeline of Lincoln
 Timeline of Liverpool
 Timeline of London
Timeline of Manchester
 Timeline of Norwich
 Timeline of Nottingham
Timeline of Oxford
 Timeline of Plymouth
Timeline of Reading
Timeline of Sheffield
 Timeline of Southampton
Timeline of St Columb Major
Timeline of Sunderland
Timeline of York

County timelines
 Timeline of Cheshire
 Timeline of Cornwall
Timeline of Northumbria and Northumberland
Timeline of Somerset
Timeline of Sussex

References

Bibliography 
 Marsden, Peter, Sealed by Time: The Loss and Recovery of the Mary Rose. The Archaeology of the Mary Rose, Volume 1. The Mary Rose Trust, Portsmouth. 2003.

Further reading 
 
 
 

Years in England
English